Penicillium corynephorum is an anamorph species of the genus of Penicillium.

See also
 List of Penicillium species

References

Further reading
 
 

corynephorum
Fungi described in 1985